The Goswick rail crash occurred on 26 October 1947 near the village of Goswick, Northumberland, England. The Flying Scotsman express from Edinburgh Waverley to London King's Cross failed to slow down for a diversion and derailed. Twenty-eight people were killed, including the talented Scottish biochemist, John Masson Gulland. It was the last major accident to occur on British railways before their nationalisation on 1 January 1948.

Overview 

The train was scheduled to divert from the fast line to a goods loop at Goswick, Northumberland, between Berwick-upon-Tweed and Morpeth, because of engineering work. The engine, A3 Class No. 66 "Merry Hampton", and most of the train derailed and overturned.

The driver, fireman and guard had all failed to read the notice of the diversion posted at Haymarket depot. The driver, who was held principally at fault, had also allowed an unauthorised passenger on to the footplate who may have distracted his attention. He claimed to have missed the distant signal due to smoke from the engine obscuring his view. The home signal had been cleared to allow the train to draw up slowly to the points, but the signalman was exonerated because he could not judge the speed of the train until it was too late. 

A similar accident occurred two years earlier at Bourne End, Hertfordshire.

Similar accidents 

  Bourne End rail crash - overspeed through turnout
  Jokela rail crash - Finland
  Milton rail crash - England

See also 
 Lists of rail accidents
 List of rail accidents in the United Kingdom
 Books on British railway accidents

References 

 
 
  Railways Archive account, including official Accident Report

External links
British Pathe newsreel

Railway accidents and incidents in Northumberland
Railway accidents in 1947
1947 in England
History of Northumberland
20th century in Northumberland
Derailments in England
Accidents and incidents involving London and North Eastern Railway
1947 disasters in the United Kingdom
October 1947 events in the United Kingdom
Rail accidents caused by a driver's error